KCFY (88.1 FM) is a radio station broadcasting a Christian hot AC format. Licensed to Yuma, Arizona, United States, it serves the Yuma area.  The station is currently owned by Relevant Media, Inc..

External links
 
 
 

Moody Radio affiliate stations
CFY